Jürgen Raab (born 20 December 1958 in Zeulenroda, Bezirk Gera) is a former East German football player.

Career
In the DDR-Oberliga Jürgen Raab played for FC Carl Zeiss Jena 376 games and scored 120 goals.

International career
He played 20 times for the East Germany national football team and scored two goals.

Coaching career
He was later a manager for Rot-Weiß Erfurt, FC Sachsen Leipzig and assistant coach by Bursaspor and 1. FC Nürnberg. On 1 June 2010, he replaced René van Eck at his former club FC Carl Zeiss Jena as head coach.

In October 2014, he signed for the Singapore national team on a one-year contract. His role was to work with head coach, Bernd Stange particularly in the area of fitness. After former Courts Young Lions head coach, Aide Iskandar's resignation, he was named the head coach for the Courts Young Lions in the Singapore League for the rest of the 2015 season.

In January 2017, less than a week after announcing the parting of ways with Akbar Nawas, Tampines Rovers FC have confirmed Raab as their head coach starting from the 2017 S.League season, signing a three-year contract to take charge of the five-time S.League champions.

Jurgen was relieved of his duties at Tampines Rovers on 9 October 2018. In his 2 year stint with Tampines Rovers, he brought them to finish as the league's second place in 2017 and fourth place in 2018.

References

1958 births
Living people
People from Zeulenroda-Triebes
People from Bezirk Gera
German footballers
East German footballers
Footballers from Thuringia
FC Carl Zeiss Jena players
East Germany international footballers
German football managers
FC Rot-Weiß Erfurt managers
2. Bundesliga players
DDR-Oberliga players
Association football midfielders
3. Liga managers
Borussia Mönchengladbach non-playing staff
German expatriate sportspeople in Singapore
Bursaspor non-playing staff
German expatriate sportspeople in Turkey